Riverdale Avenue Books, located in Riverdale, Bronx, New York, is a publisher of e-books, print books on demand and audiobooks founded in 2012 by Lori Perkins. Riverdale is a member of the American Association of Publishers and publishes between 50 and 75 books a year.

Awards
In 2014, Riverdale Avenue Books was named "Bisexual Publisher of the Year" by the Bi Writers Association.

In addition to hitting Amazon's bestsellers lists, Riverdale's books and authors have won numerous awards.  In 2017 Outside the XY: Queer Black and Brown Masculinity, edited by Morgan Mann Willis won an IPPY Gold Medal in the Gay/Lesbian/Bi/Trans Non-Fiction category and Queering Sexual Violence: Radical Voices from Within the Anti-Violence Movement, by Jennifer Patterson won an IPPY Silver Medal in the same category.  In addition, Juliet Takes a Breath by Gabby Rivera won an IPPY Silver Medal in the Gay/Lesbian/Bi/Trans Fiction category. In 2016, Menage a Musketeer: A Novel of Swords and Debauchery by USA Today's Best Selling Author Lissa Trevor won the IPPY Gold Medal Award for Erotica and Finding Maculinity — Female to Male Transition in Adulthood by Alexander Walker and Emmett J. P. Lundberg won the IPPY Silver Medal for Gay/Lesbian/Bi/Trans Non-Fiction.  In 2017 Juliet Takes a Breath was selected by the Amelia Bloomer Project Committee of the American Library Association (ALA) for the 2017 Amelia Bloomer List, which features the books with significant feminist content published in the previous 18 months that appeal to young readers. The Amelia Bloomer Project is part of the ALA, Social Responsibilities Round Table (SRRT) Feminist Task Force. Outside the XY: Black and Brown Queer Masculinity by Morgan Mann Willis was nominated as a Lambda Literary Award Finalist  in the Transgender Nonfiction category.

At the onset of the Me Too movement, Riverdale published an anthology of 26 essays edited by Lori Perkins titled #MeToo: Essays About How and Why This Happened, What It Means and How to Make Sure It Never Happens Again. The digital version of the book rose to number 1 in Amazon's Kindle Store Nonfiction / Politics & Social Sciences / Women's Studies / Feminist Theory category and number 5 in Biographies & Memoirs / Leaders & Notable People / Political in the Kindle Top 100 Free Categories.

Imprints
Riverdale publishes its curated books under 13 imprints.
 Desire: erotica/erotic romance titles
 Riverdale/Magnus: LGBT titles
 Afraid: horror titles 
 SFF: science fiction fantasy titles
 120 Days: LBTQ pulp fiction titles
 Circlet : erotica/erotic romance titles
 Truth: erotic memoir titles
 Dagger: mystery/thriller/suspense titles
 Verve: lifestyle titles
 Hera: titles featuring true and fictional lives and loves of women aged 35 and up
 Pop: pop culture titles
 Sports and Gaming: sports and gaming titles.

Authors
Riverdale's authors include Cecilia Tan, Riki Wilchins, Trinity Blacio, Lissa Trevor, Marc Shapiro, Chris Shirley, Gabby Rivera and Andrew Gray, among many others.

Local Events
Riverdale is the only publisher in New York City with a reading series open to authors of erotica and erotic romance. The Downtown Series is held at People Lounge in New York City on the first Friday of every month, and the Uptown Series is held at An Beal Bocht in Riverdale, Bronx, on the second Monday of every month.

References

External links

Book publishing companies based in New York City
Small press publishing companies
LGBT book publishing companies
Erotic publishers
BDSM publishers
Romance book publishing companies